Sagehen Nunataks is a roughly triangular group of nunataks rising to about  above base level on the east side of Holdsworth Glacier,  north of McNally Peak, in the Queen Maud Mountains, Antarctica. They were mapped by United States Geological Survey (USGS) from surveys and U.S. Navy aerial photographs from 1960 to 1964. In 1978–79 they were visited by a United States Antarctic Research Program (USARP)-Arizona State University geological field party. They were named after the Sagehen, mascot of Pomona College in Claremont, California, the alma mater of Scott G. Borg, one of the field party members.

Amundsen Coast
Nunataks of the Ross Dependency